Vempalle Shareef is an Indian Short Story Writer. He writes stories in Telugu. He is also a senior journalist.  Shaik Mohammad Shareef (born 18 April 1980) also known as Vempalle Shareef hails from the Vempalli village of Kadapa district, Andhra Pradesh. He has so far published 60 stories in Telugu, out of which 30 are for children. Shareef is also worked as the Chief Sub Editor & News Presenter for Sakshi TV in Hyderabad. He was earlier an RJ with AIR, Hyderabad. Having an academic flair, he completed his PhD with the Potti Sreeramulu Telugu University.

Recently Government of Andhra Pradesh awarded on the occasion of "Telugu Bhasha Dinothsavam" and also He got Chaso award. He was also awarded the "Kendra Sahitya Academy Young Award".

In one of the Interview, Shareef said that writing is not a vocation or avocation for him; he writes only when he is in suffering or grief and for comfort.

Shareef' stories have been translated into many of Indian languages. Jumma book translated in English and Kannada languages. In Kannada Jumma has got kuvempu Bhasha Bharathi Award.

He writes lessons for Telugu Journalism students in Press Akademi and Telugu University.

<ref>https://www.mpositive.in/tag/vempalle-shareef/

References

Telugu-language writers
1980 births
Living people